The Albanian Orthography Congress  was a linguistics event held in Tirana, People's Republic of Albania in 1972. It established for the first time the unified orthographic rules of the Albanian language which are still in use today.

Background
The efforts of establishing unified orthographic rules for the Albanian language had started in 1916 with the Literary Commission, in Shkodër, which aimed mainly in establishing a literary standard and established an "as phonetic as possible" approach of the future set of orthographic rules. After World War II, the differences and divergences between writing from within Albania and its adjacent Albanian populated regions were becoming visible. With the establishment of the University of Prishtina and the spread of Albanian literature in Yugoslavia, the unification of orthographic rules became crucial. Serious attempts were made in the '60s toward the standardization, starting with the publication Rregullat e drejtshkrimit të shqipes (Rules of Albanian language orthography) by a joint project of the University of Tirana and the Institute of Linguistics and Literature led by Androkli Kostallari. A conference was held in Pristina in 1968, the Linguistic Conference of Pristina (Alb: Konsulta gjuhësore e Prishtinës), where the literary standard used so far in Albania and based in the Tosk Albanian dialect was adopted by the Albanians of Yugoslavia at the expense of the Gheg dialect.

Event

The congress took place in Tirana from 20 to 25 November 1972. Its moto was "One nation, one language". It was organized by the Institute of Linguistics and Literature (Instituti i gjuhësisë) and the University of Tirana. 87 delegates from Albania, Yugoslavia, and Arbëreshë participated. The congress issued a resolution which established the rules and principles of the standard Albanian orthography as developed up to that time. The conclusions of the congress were further elaborated by a post-deployment commission (Androkli Kostallari, Eqerem Çabej, Mahir Domi, Emil Lafe) which published and distributed the volumes Orthography of the Albanian language (Alb: Drejtshkrimi i gjuhës shqipe) of 1973 and Orthographic dictionary of the Albanian language (Alb: Fjalor drejtshkrimor i gjuhës shqipe) of 1976.

The standard established by the congress is still in place today with very few changes by other recent Albanian language-related conferences.

Notable participants
The following list of notable participants were signatories of the decision adopted by the congress of the new orthographic standards:

Importance
The congress was a milestone event in the history of the Albanian language. The unification of orthography was crucial for the identity of the Albanian language. It was considered a big success the encompassing of the Yugoslavia-based literature and press under the umbrella of the linguistic authorities of Tirana, thus contributing in a stronger unified Albanian identity.

Criticism
Arshi Pipa, was one of the strongest critics of the time toward the congress and the rules that came out if it, due to the deprivation of Gheg element in favour of the Tosk one. Similar discussions continue as to date. In addition to the limitations induced by the young age of the academic institutions in the Albanian world, deep concerns were raised due to the delegate selection criteria in order to meet the communist political agenda, participation of simple elementary school teachers without any academic background, low number of academic titles of the delegates in overall, as well as non-specific Albanian language concentration of the ones that did have academic titles. Concretely, 72 out of 85 did not have a scientific degree, out of 15 others 5 of them had scientific degrees in other fields (not linguistics). Out of 5 linguists with scientific degrees, one was on Russian language (Kostallari). For the rest, over 2/3 of the delegates had the only foreign language the Russian language or the Serbo-Croatian one. 37 of the delegates did not make it to enter the Albanian Encyclopedic Dictionary (Alb: Fjalori Enciklopedik Shqiptar).

Many other researchers and albanologists have reacted in favor of the congress's decisions, sending petitions to Prime Minister Edi Rama that the standard should not be revised. Kristo Frashëri, Albania's main personality in the field of history, rejected any criticism. According to Frashëri, "the language is not a monopoly of the linguists, it belongs to all those who speak the language, the standard has incorporated many aspects of the Gheg dialect as well, and that two orthography standards would lead to two separate nations, just like Croats and Serbs".

See also
 Congress of Manastir

References

1972 in Albania
Albanian language
1972 conferences
 1972